Teddington Pools and Fitness Centre is a public swimming pool and fitness centre owned and operated by the London Borough of Richmond upon Thames located in Vicarage Road, off the A313, in Teddington.

Originally built as a lido pool in 1931, it was closed in 1976 and rebuilt as an indoor facility in 1978.

Other facilities include a gym and studio space.

Since its original construction in 1931, the pool has been home to Richmond Swimming Club, who continue to use the facility. After the pool was rebuilt, Teddington Swimming Club was formed and continue to use it as a base. Teddington Sub Aqua Club also use the pool.

Transport
Teddington Pools and Fitness Centre has a pay and display car park and is served by London Buses route 281, 285 and R68. London Buses route 33 and X26 also stop nearby.

References

External links

Buildings and structures in the London Borough of Richmond upon Thames
Teddington
Sport in the London Borough of Richmond upon Thames
Swimming venues in London